Heather Michell Macy (born April 4, 1978) is an American college basketball coach who is the current Head Coach at Greensboro College and is the all-time winningest head coach of the East Carolina University women's basketball team.  Macy is also the Elite Performance CEO for the 2FeetIn organization and the author of the books Two Feet Forward and Believe-Think-Live Two Feet In.

High school career

Macy attended Starmount High School in Boonville, North Carolina from 1992 to 1996. She played on the women's basketball team as the starting point guard from 1994 to 1996. Macy's accomplishments led her to be named all-Tri-County player twice and an All-Northwest 2A conference player. In her senior year, she led her team to a conference tournament championship. Macy recorded 10 points and five assists per game as a sophomore and improved  to 14 points per game and six  assists as a senior. Her accomplishments led her to be named to the Hall of Fame for her high school, one of 12 members in the first class of inductees.

College
Macy was a four-year letter winner at Greensboro College, where she earned a bachelor of science degree in sport and exercise science. She competed on both the basketball and tennis teams. As a basketball player, Macy scored 707 points while at Greensboro, which placed her 11th on the school's career scoring list. She also recorded 207 assists, which ranked her in the top 10 for the school and is a member of the school's Hall of Fame. After completing her undergraduate degree, Macy attended the University of Southern Mississippi for two summers, where she earned a master's degree in human performance and recreation in 2002.

Coaching career

She began her coaching career immediately after graduating from Greensboro as an assistant at Division II Catawba College. She served as an assistant at Catawba for a single year and then became an assistant at Division II Lenoir–Rhyne University. She then served as an assistant for two years at two Division I schools, High Point University and then a year at University of Maryland, Baltimore County.

Pfeiffer University 
Macy took on her first head coaching position as the head coach at Pfeiffer University in 2005. In her first year, she took over a team with a record of 8–20 and just four returning players and guided the team to a record of 14–15. In Macy's second year, the team improved to 26 –5 overall, and 18–3 in the conference to win the regular season conference as well as the conference tournament. The team was invited to the NCAA Division II postseason tournament, where they lost in the first round. Macy was named the conference coach of the year in 2007. Macy's two-year winning percentage of .667 is the second best among all Pfeiffer coaches and the best among coaches with more than a single year.

Francis Marion
Macy was hired to be the head coach at Francis Marion University in 2007. In the first season, she guided the team to a 21–9 record, finishing first in the Peach Belt Conference and earning an invitation to the NCAA Division II postseason tournament. Using coaching methods Macy learned and implemented up over the years, the team improved in the second year to 27–5 overall, again finishing first in the conference and going to the NCAA tournament, where they reached the Sweet 16. In Macy's third and final year at Francis Marion, the team again went 27–5, finishing second in the conference and reaching the second round of the postseason NCAA Division II tournament. Macy was named the conference coach of the year in both 2008 and 2009. The team finished the season ranked #20 in the USA Today/ESPN Division II Top 25 poll. Macy left the school for East Carolina University at the end of the season.

East Carolina

In 2010, Macy was hired by Division I East Carolina to head their women's basketball program. Macy's teams recorded the highest grade point averages among all Conference USA women's basketball team in both 2012–13 and 2013–14. In 2014, she received a five-year extension to her contract, which thus extended through the 2019–20 season.  On October 17, 2018, Macy resigned amid an internal review based upon a misunderstanding of practice rules to prevent amplifying distraction from an already controversial athletic department.  She left the Pirates as the all-time winningest coach in program history.

Spartanburg Methodist

In 2019–2020 Macy served as the head women’s basketball coach at Spartanburg Methodist College. During her lone season with the Pioneers, Macy led her team to Region X regular-season and tournament championships while posting a 21–8 record and being named Region X Coach of the Year.

Greensboro College (Current)

In 2020 Macy returned to her Alma Mater after being named Head Women's Basketball Coach and Assistant Athletic Director.  After starting the season 1–7, GC finished the year with a 6–9 record, placing fourth in the conference in her first season as Pride Head Coach.  In her second season, 2021–2022, Coach Macy led the Pride to a share of the regular season USA South East Division Championship, with a 17–1 conference record and 25–2 overall, the best in school history.  The Pride won 18 consecutive games until falling in the semi-finals of the conference tournament.  She mentored two players to the All USA South First team, and her team finished in the top 10 of scoring offenses nationally, at over 84 points per game, as well as 9th nationally in scoring margin (24.4 points) and 13th nationally in field goal percentage (34.2%).  She earned her 300th career victory in Greensboro's February 12 win over Meredith.

2FeetIn

Coach Macy is also the Elite Performance CEO for the 2FeetIn organization and the author of the books Two Feet Forward and Believe-Think-Live Two Feet In.  She currently travels around the country educating teams, coaches, and organizations on how to use EQ to become an elite performer. Several of these presentations are currently published on CoachTube.com for download. She has been a speaker at some of the top coaching clinics and professional development events in the country, including USA Basketball and Nike Championship Clinics. Coach Macy is also a frequent speaker at corporate and leadership events on the topics of leadership, teamwork, accountability, and discipline. She is currently hosting a 1-hour weekly Rising Coaches TV series discussing her book, Two Feet Forward: Everyday Lessons in Leadership. This book was a #1 new release in basketball coaching on Amazon.

Combined with her EQ Certification, in the spring of 2020, Coach Macy also received aspecialization in Positive Psychology from the University of Pennsylvania.

Head coaching record

References

1978 births
Living people
People from Yadkin County, North Carolina
American women's basketball coaches
East Carolina Pirates women's basketball coaches
Greensboro College alumni
College women's basketball players in the United States
Greensboro Pride
High Point Panthers women's basketball coaches
Pfeiffer Falcons coaches
Francis Marion Patriots women's basketball coaches